Events from the year 1744 in art.

Events

Works
 Bernardo Bellotto – Vaprio d'Adda (Metropolitan Museum of Art, New York)
 Canaletto (British Royal Collection)
 Entrance to the Grand Canal, looking east
 Piazza S. Marco, looking south
 Piazza S. Marco, looking west
 Charles-Michel-Ange Challe – Sleeping Diana
 Georg Desmarées – Portrait of Franz Joachim Beich
 Thomas Hudson – Portrait of King George II
 Jean-Étienne Liotard – The Chocolate Girl (approximate date)
 Giovanni Battista Tiepolo
 The Banquet of Cleopatra (National Gallery of Victoria)
 Ceiling paintings in Würzburg Residence
 Translation of the House of Loreto (frescos in Church of the Scalzi (Venice); destroyed 1915 (approximate completion date))
 Decorations for Villa Cordellini (Montecchio Maggiore)
 Christian Friedrich Zincke – Miniature portrait of Sir Robert Walpole in Garter robes

Births
 February 13 – David Allan, Scottish painter (died 1796)
 July 9 – François-Guillaume Ménageot, French painter of religious and French historical scenes (died 1816)
 October 27 – Mary Moser, English painter primarily of flowers (died 1819)
 October 25 – Daniel Berger, German engraver (died 1825)
 October 28 – William Hodges, English landscape painter (died 1797)
 December 10
William Berczy, Canadian pioneer and painter (died 1813)
Thomas Parkinson, British portrait painter (died 1789)
 December 15 – Jean-François Pierre Peyron, French neoclassical painter (died 1814)
 December 21 – Anne Vallayer-Coster, French painter (died 1818)
 date unknown
 Manuel Acevedo, Spanish painter (died 1800)
 Prosper-Gabriel Audran, French engraver and teacher (died 1819)
 Okada Beisanjin – Japanese painter (died 1820)
 Hendrik de Meijer, Dutch painter (died 1793)
 János Donát, Hungarian painter (died 1830)
 Hermanus Numan, Dutch artist, art theorist, and publisher (died 1820)
 Gabriel Gotthard Sweidel, Finnish church painter (died 1813)

Deaths
 January 18 – Michele Marieschi, Italian painter of landscapes or vistas (a vedutisti) (born 1710)
 January 22 – Pierre Lepautre, French sculptor (born 1659)
 February 13 – Pierre Gobert, French painter (born 1662)
 February 17 – René Frémin, French sculptor (born 1672)
 March 9 – Giuseppe Zola, Italian painter of landscapes with small figures (born 1675)
 June 7 – Pietro Ercole Fava, Italian nobleman and art patron (born 1669)
 July 28 – Lorenzo De Ferrari, Italian painter of the Baroque period (born 1680)
 October – Domenico Maria Muratori, Bolognese (Italian) painter, studied under Lorenzo Pasinelli at Bologna (born 1661), painted La mort de Cléopâtre in the Louvre
 date unknown
 Charles Collins, Irish painter primarily of animals and still-life (born 1680)
 Marcantonio Riverditi – Italian painter of portraits and altarpieces (born unknown)
 Maria Verelst, Dutch miniature and portrait painter (born 1680)

References

 
Years of the 18th century in art
1740s in art